What You Make It is a short story collection by English writer Michael Marshall Smith, first published in 1999. It was his first  short story collection. The contents were later republished as part of the expanded collection More Tomorrow & Other Stories, which, unlike What You Make It, was available outside of the UK.

Contents

"More Tomorrow" - Winner of the 1996 British Fantasy Award for Best Short Story
"Everybody Goes"
"Hell Hath Enlarged Herself". Gone into production as a co-production between Lightworks Films and Cuba Productions, financed by the UK Film Council
"A Place to Stay"
"Later"
"The Man Who Drew Cats" - Winner of the 1990 British Fantasy Award for Best Short Story
"The Fracture"
"Save As..."
"More Bitter Than Death"
"Diet Hell"
"The Owner"
"Foreign Bodies"
"Sorted"
"The Dark Land" - Winner of the 1991 British Fantasy Award for Best Short Story
"When God Lived in Kentish Town"
"Always"
"What You Make It"
"The Truth Game"

External links
What You Make It at the author's website

1999 short story collections
Short story collections by Michael Marshall Smith
HarperCollins books